Nerdkween (pronounced "nerd queen") is the stage name for the American singer/songwriter and composer Monica Arrington, who is known for lo-fi recordings and minimalist style of electric guitar playing with added electronic noises. She is also known for a wide range in vocal ability, from haunting and airy tones to gritty and country-like twangs. Her music is a part of the genres noise pop, lo-fi, slowcore or dream pop. Arrington started self-releasing cassette tape demos in 2000 starting with "i see things differently now". Then she put out other CD demos "the dark horse" and "Sketches at Eddie's Attic". Arrington's debut full-length album "Synergy" is distributed through Stickfigure Records in Atlanta, Georgia.

Discography
 i see things differently now 2000 cassette tape
 the dark horse 2002 CD
 Sketches at Eddie's Attic 2004 CD
 Synergy 2008 CD Stickfigure Records

Credits
 Vocals on "The Delores Lesion" CD 2004 from Metal band Lilitu

References

External links
 Unconventionally Beautiful Music: Nerdkween
 Official Nerdkween MySpace page
 Performer Magazine
 Creative Loafing
 Nerdkween looks Preppy but Sounds PostModern
 [ All Music- Lilitu]
 Encyclopaedia Metallum

African-American women singer-songwriters
Living people
Writers from Anderson, Indiana
Musicians from Anderson, Indiana
Torch singers
Year of birth missing (living people)
21st-century African-American women singers
Singer-songwriters from Indiana